Alexander Alexandrovich Krushelnitskiy (born 20 May 1992) is a Russian curler predominantly playing as skip. He was banned for four years for doping.

Career
He and Anastasia Bryzgalova won the 2016 World Mixed Doubles Curling Championship in Karlstad, Sweden. He plays for CC Adamant (St. Petersburg).

On 18 February 2018, it was reported that he had failed a doping test for meldonium at the Winter Olympics, and was awaiting testing of the B sample. After the B sample was also positive, the Court of Arbitration for Sport confirmed that they were instituting formal proceedings against him.

On 22 February 2018, it was confirmed that Krushelnitskiy would be stripped of his Olympic bronze medal, due to his anti-doping rule violation.

On 4 December 2018, he was banned from participating in sports for four years (retroactively starting on 12 February 2018).

Personal life
Krushelnitskiy studied at the Lesgaft National State University of Physical Education, Sport and Health. He is married to his doubles partner, Anastasia Bryzgalova.

In 2019, he opened a curling school in his home city of St. Petersburg.

Awards
 Master of Sports of Russia
 : Gold

References

External links
 

Living people
1992 births
Russian male curlers
Russian curling champions
Curlers from Saint Petersburg
World mixed doubles curling champions
Curlers at the 2018 Winter Olympics
Olympic curlers of Russia
Competitors stripped of Winter Olympics medals
Russian sportspeople in doping cases
Doping cases in curling
World mixed curling champions